Christopher Noki Minimbi (born 24 January 2000) is a Fijian rugby union player, currently playing for the . His preferred position is lock.

Professional career
Minimbi was named in the Fijian Drua squad for the 2022 Super Rugby Pacific season. Minimbi is a Fiji international, having made his debut against Georgia in 2020.

References

External links
 

2000 births
Living people
Fijian rugby union players
Fiji international rugby union players
Rugby union locks
Fijian Drua players